The List of Windmills in Derbyshire is a list of former and extant windmills in the English county  of Derbyshire.

Locations

References

Sources

Maps
1675 John Ogilby
1791 Burdett (surveyed 1762-67)
1808 James Farey
1825 Greenwood
1827 Greenwood
1834 Ordnance Survey
1835 Greenwood
1835† George Sanderson (surveyed 1830-35)
1836 Ordnance Survey
1839 Ordnance Survey
1840 Ordnance Survey
1880 Ordnance Survey
1881 Ordnance Survey
1887 Ordnance Survey
1895 Ordnance Survey (surveyed 1879-83)
1896 Ordnance Survey (surveyed 1876)
1897 Ordnance Survey (surveyed 1875-85)
1899 Ordnance Survey
1905 Ordnance Survey
1906 Ordnance Survey
1908 Ordnance Survey (surveyed 1905-06)
1914 Ordnance Survey
1916 Ordnance Survey

Derbyshire
Windmills